Paratype univitta is a moth in the subfamily Arctiinae. It was described by George Hampson in 1900. It is found in the Brazilian states of Rio de Janeiro, Paraná and Rio Grande do Sul and Goya, Argentina.

References

Lithosiini
Moths described in 1900